Events from the year 1866 in Ireland.

Events
28 January – the Midland Great Western Railway opens to Westport railway station.
22 June – Archbishop Cullen is elevated to the cardinalate as the first Irish Cardinal.
13 July – the  sets out from Valentia Island on the second (successful) attempt to lay the transatlantic telegraph cable. Robert Halpin is master and William Thomson technical consultant.
14 October – St Peter's Church, Belfast, later to become the Roman Catholic Cathedral, is dedicated, although the building is incomplete.
Maziere Brady retires as Lord Chancellor of Ireland, an office to which he was appointed in 1846.
Alexandra College is founded at Milltown, Dublin by the Quaker Ann Jellicoe, the first women's college in Ireland to aim at a university-level education.

Sport
 The first modern Irish Derby, created by the 3rd Earl of Howth, the 3rd Marquess of Drogheda and the 3rd Earl of Charlemont, is run at the Curragh Racecourse.
 The Ulster Yacht Club is revived at Bangor, County Down, on the initiative of Frederick Temple Blackwood, 5th Baron Dufferin and Claneboye.

The Arts
 The ballad "Come Back to Erin" is composed by 'Claribel', the English songwriter Charlotte Alington Barnard.

Births
5 February – Domhnall Ua Buachalla, member of 1st Dáil, Fianna Fáil TD, last Governor-General of the Irish Free State (died 1963).
February – Michael Egan, trade unionist, city councillor and Cumann na nGaedheal TD (died 1947).
15 June – Charles Wood, composer (died 1926).
13 July – Emily Winifred Dickson, gynaecologist (died 1944 in Liverpool).
16 August – Dora Sigerson, poet (died 1918 in London).
1 November – Cheiro, born William John Warner, astrologer (died 1936 in the United States).
3 December – Ethna Carbery, born Anna Johnston, writer and poet (died 1902).
7 December – Maude Delap, marine biologist (died 1953)
December – Thomas Byrne, recipient of the Victoria Cross for gallantry in 1898 at the Battle of Omdurman, Sudan (died 1944).
Full date unknown
Éamon a Búrc, tailor and seanchaí (died 1942).
Master McGrath, greyhound (died 1873).
Bridget Sullivan, domestic housemaid for Borden family of Fall River, Massachusetts (died 1948 in the United States).

Deaths
5 January – Augustus Warren Baldwin, naval officer and political figure in Upper Canada (born 1776).
11 January – Gustavus Vaughan Brooke, actor (born 1818).
17 January – George Petrie, painter, musician, antiquary and archaeologist (born 1790).
4 March – Alexander Campbell, religious leader in Britain and the United States (born 1788).
18 May – Francis Sylvester Mahony, humorist and poet (aka Father Prout) (born 1804).
26 October – John Kinder Labatt, brewer in Canada (born 1803).
26 October – Patrick McHale, soldier, recipient of the Victoria Cross for gallantry in 1857 at Lucknow, India (born 1826).
Full date unknown
Edward Eagar, lawyer and criminal transported to Australia, politician (born 1787; died in London).

References

 
1860s in Ireland
Years of the 19th century in Ireland
Ireland
 Ireland